Unterliederbach is a quarter of Frankfurt am Main, Germany. It is part of the Ortsbezirk West and is subdivided into the Stadtbezirke Unterliederbach-Ost, Unterliederbach-Mitte and Unterliederbach-West.

References

Districts of Frankfurt